Fyodor Korovkin is a Russian history writer well known for the book History of the Ancient World.

Bibliography
 History of the Ancient World (1981)

References

External links
 History of the Ancient World  on Google Books

Russian writers
Living people
Year of birth missing (living people)